Lim Joong-Yong (born 21 April 1975) is a retired South Korean football player and coach.

Club career 

Im made his professional debut for Busan I'cons in 1999, playing a number of games in his first two seasons with the club.  However, he saw much less matchplay in 2001 and 2002, and a move to newly formed Daegu FC beckoned.  After Daegu's debut season in the K-League, for 2004, Im moved to current club Incheon United, newly formed for the 2004 K-League season. Im remains with Incheon into the 2010 season, having played over 200 games in all competitions for the club.  

Im plays both as a defender and as a mid-field defender. He retired end of 2011 season.

Club career statistics

Honours

Individual
K-League Best XI : 2005

External links

1975 births
Living people
Association football defenders
South Korean footballers
Busan IPark players
Daegu FC players
Incheon United FC players
K League 1 players
Sungkyunkwan University alumni